The Dolores River Bridge was a through truss bridge that spanned the Dolores River near Bedrock, Colorado, United States. It carried State Highway 90 and was listed on the National Register of Historic Places.

The bridge was designed by the Colorado Department of Highways and was fabricated by Midwest Steel & Iron Works. It was installed in 1952 by contractor Gardner Construction Company.

Dismantling and replacement
In 2014, inspectors discovered a crack in one of the bridge's main beams. The Colorado Department of Transportation (CDOT) then closed the bridge to traffic and installed a one-lane, temporary bridge. With the temporary bridge in place, the old bridge was dismantled, its pieces labeled and stored in a warehouse for possible future use as a footbridge or bike trail bridge. CDOT then constructed a new precast-concrete girder bridge, which opened to traffic in 2017.

See also
List of bridges documented by the Historic American Engineering Record in Colorado

References

External links

Colorado Department of Transportation bridge replacement project website

Transportation buildings and structures in Montrose County, Colorado
Road bridges on the National Register of Historic Places in Colorado
Bridges completed in 1952
Historic American Engineering Record in Colorado
National Register of Historic Places in Montrose County, Colorado
Metal bridges in the United States
Truss bridges in the United States
Former road bridges in the United States